Valley of the Boom (stylized as Valley_of_the_BOOM) is an American docudrama television miniseries created by Matthew Carnahan that premiered on January 13, 2019, on National Geographic. The series centers on the 1990s tech boom and bust in Silicon Valley and it stars Bradley Whitford, Steve Zahn, Lamorne Morris, John Karna, Dakota Shapiro, Oliver Cooper, and John Murphy.

Premise
Valley of the Boom takes a close look at "the culture of speculation, innovation and debauchery that led to the rapid inflation and burst of the 1990s tech bubble. As with its hybrid series Mars, Nat Geo [uses] select doc elements to support the scripted drama to tell the true inside story of the dramatic early days of Silicon Valley."

The series features interviews with many of the people depicted in the dramatized portions of the production in addition to other Internet personalities such as Mark Cuban and Arianna Huffington. Notably absent from these interviews are Netscape co-founder and former vice president of technology Marc Andreessen, who declined to be interviewed, and Jamie Zawinski.

Although the program is primarily focused on the quick rise and fall of three influential technology companies, namely Netscape, theGlobe.com, and Pixelon, the program also highlights smaller companies of that era, such as sfGirl.com.

Cast and characters

Main

 Bradley Whitford as James L. Barksdale
 Lamorne Morris as Darrin Morris
 Oliver Cooper as Todd Krizelman
 John Karna as Marc Andreessen
 Dakota Shapiro as Stephan Paternot
 John Murphy as Jim Clark
 Steve Zahn as Michael Fenne

Recurring

 Raf Rogers as Sean Alvaro
 Chiara Zanni as Sheila
 Fred Henderson as Mike Egan
 Camille Hollett-French as Tara Hernandez
 Mike Kovac as Balding Ponytail Coder
 Nick Hunnings as Ed Cespedes
 Tom Stevens as Phillip
 Siobhan Williams as Jenn
 Vincent Dangerfield as Lee Wiskowski
 Jacob Richter as Dan Goodin
 Hilary Jardine as Patty Beron
 Paul Herbert as Paul Ward
 Carey Feehan as Robert Dunning
 Donna Benedicto as Kate

Guest

 Keegan Connor Tracy as Rosanne Siino ("Part 1: print ("hello, world")")
 Luvia Petersen as Mary Meeker ("Part 1: print ("hello, world")")
 Michael Patrick Denis as Thomas Reardon ("Part 2: pseudocode")
 Jesse James as Barry Moore ("Part 4: priority inversion")
 Siobhan Williams as Jenn ("Part 4: priority inversion")
 Doug Abrahams as Ace Greenberg ("Part 4: priority inversion")
 David Stuart as Pit Boss ("Part 4: priority inversion")
 Connor Tracy as Rosanne Siino ("Part 5: segfault")
 Rachel Hayward as Joyce ("Part 5: segfault")
 Tom Stevens as Phillip ("Part 6: fatal error")

Episodes

Production

Development
On November 15, 2017, it was announced that National Geographic had given the production a series order consisting of six episodes. Executive producers are set to include Matthew Carnahan, Arianna Huffington, Jason Goldberg, Brant Pinvidic, and David Walpert. Carnahan is also expected to act as showrunner for the series and direct as well. David Newsom is co-executive producer and will lead the non-scripted unit of the production. Joel Ehninger is expected to act in the role of producer. Production companies involved with the series include STXtelevision and Matthew Carnahan Circus Products. On September 24, 2018, it was announced that the series would premiere on January 13, 2019.

Casting
On March 16, 2018, it was announced that Bradley Whitford, Steve Zahn, Lamorne Morris, John Karna, Dakota Shapiro, and Oliver Cooper had joined the series' main cast.

Filming
Principal photography for the series began on March 26, 2018 in Vancouver, Canada and was expected to conclude by May 28, 2018.

Release

Marketing
On July 24, 2018, the first trailer for the series was released.

Premiere
On September 21, 2018, the series held its world premiere during the second annual Tribeca TV Festival in New York City. Following a screening, a conversation took place featuring members of the cast and crew including creator Matthew Carnahan, actors Bradley Whitford, Steve Zahn, Lamorne Morris, and real-life subject Stephan Paternot, founder of theGlobe.com.

Distribution
The series will premiere globally on National Geographic in 171 countries and 45 languages. STXtelevision will distribute the series in China.

Reception
The series has been met with a mixed response from critics upon its premiere. On the review aggregation website Rotten Tomatoes, the series holds a 67% approval rating with an average rating of 5.85 out of 10 based on 15 reviews. The website's critical consensus reads, "A visual collage of dot com history, Valley of Boom proves to be just as sprawling and ramshackle as the docuseries' subject." Metacritic, which uses a weighted average, assigned the series a score of 58 out of 100 based on 11 critics, indicating "mixed or average reviews".

Notes

References

External links
 
 

2019 American television series debuts
2019 American television series endings
Documentary television series about computing
English-language television shows
National Geographic (American TV channel) original programming
Nerd culture
Science docudramas